The 2022–23 Sarajevo season is the club's 74th season in history, and their 29th consecutive season in the top flight of Bosnian football, the Premier League of BiH. Besides competing in the Premier League, the team also competed in the National Cup.

Squad information

First-team squad

(5th captain)

(C)

(C)

(C)

(6th captain)

(C)

Transfers

Loans out

Kit

Friendlies

Pre-season

Mid-season

Competitions

Premier League

League table

Results summary

Results by round

Matches

Statistics

Notes

References

External links

FK Sarajevo seasons
Sarajevo